The 3rd Central Auditing Committee (CAC) of the Workers' Party of Korea (WPK), officially the Central Auditing Committee of the 3rd Congress of the Workers' Party of Korea, was elected by the 3rd Congress on 29 April 1956.

Members

References

Citations

Bibliography
Books:
 
 
  

Dissertations:
 

3rd Central Auditing Committee of the Workers' Party of Korea
1956 establishments in North Korea
1961 disestablishments in North Korea